Arthur Clifton Axford Sexton (1892 – 30 June 1970) was a New Zealand politician of the Country Party.

Biography

Early life and career
Sexton was born in Auckland in 1892. He was educated at Auckland Grammar School and later was admitted to Auckland University where he graduated with a Bachelor of Law in 1914. He then served in the army during World War I where he was twice wounded (eventually losing a leg) and rose from the rank of Private to that of Captain.

After the war he attended law lectures in London and following being discharged from military service in 1918, he married Gladys Cicely Annie Astley (1891-1962), the granddaughter of suffragist Annie Jane Schnackenberg. He passed his master's degree in laws with honours and also won the senior university scholarship in law for New Zealand in 1919. He then moved to Manurewa and began practising law in Auckland. For a total of 14 years he served as president, vice-president and executive member of the Auckland Returned Services Association.

Political career

Sexton unsuccessfully stood for the Auckland City Council as an independent candidate in the 1921 local elections. He was then elected a member of the Manurewa Town Board and for six years was chairman.

Harold Rushworth was the other member of parliament for the Country Party, and he retired in 1938. The Country Party disappeared soon after the 1938 election.

References

1892 births
1970 deaths
Country Party (New Zealand) MPs
Members of the New Zealand House of Representatives
Unsuccessful candidates in the 1938 New Zealand general election
New Zealand MPs for North Island electorates
Local politicians in New Zealand
New Zealand military personnel of World War I
New Zealand politicians with disabilities
New Zealand amputees
New Zealand Army officers